Maria Maggi may refer to:
 Eva Perón was buried under the name "Maria Maggi"
 Maria Maggi, a terrorist involved with the Piazza della Loggia bombing